A lubricant is a substance introduced to reduce friction between surfaces in mutual contact.

Lubricant may also refer to:
 Dry lubricant
 Grease (lubricant)
 Personal lubricant
 Rust and oxidation lubricant
 Social lubricant
 Surgical lubricant
 Warming lubricant

See also
 Lube (disambiguation)